E4 Extra is a British free-to-air television channel owned and operated by Channel Four Television Corporation, launched on 29 June 2022. It is a sibling channel to E4 and replaced 4Music, with 4Music in turn replacing Box Hits which has shut down. It shows comedy and entertainment programming, with music programming airing in the mornings.

Idents for the new channel have been directed by Michael Marczewski, where various everyday events develop unexpectedly, such as 'most dangerous interdimensional monster' being entered alongside a village fete's massive vegetable competition.

On 27 September 2022, E4 Extra moved from 139 to 138 on Sky, following the transition of Channel 4 HD from a single nationwide service on 138 to a fully regionalised version at channel 104 (108 in Wales, where S4C occupies 104). 139 was subsequently used by Sky Sci-Fi.

Availability

Cable
Virgin Media : Channel 337

Satellite
Freesat : Channel 181
Sky  and Sky : Channel 138

Terrestrial
Freeview : Channel 31

Programming

Comedy and drama

Baby Daddy 
Batwoman
The Big Bang Theory
Black-ish
Catastrophe
Charmed 
Dead PixelsDerry Girls Father Ted
Fresh Off the Boat 
Friday Night Dinner 
The Goldbergs 
How I Met Your Mother 
The Inbetweeners 
The IT Crowd
Malcolm in the Middle
Man Down
Mixed-ish 
Melissa and Joey 
Rick and Morty 
Sabrina the Teenage Witch 
Scrubs 
Stath Lets Flats

Reality, factual and entertainment

8 Out of 10 Cats 
8 Out of 10 Cats Does Countdown 
The Big Fat Quiz of Everything
Couples Come Dine with Me
Don't Tell the Bride (UK and Irish versions) 
The Great British Bake Off
Hotel Hell 
I Literally Just Told You
Kitchen Nightmares (US version) 
Legendary  
Married at First Sight (UK version) 
Ninja Warrior (UK reversion, previously on Challenge) 
Rude Tube 
Taskmaster (UK version) 
Travel Man
Undercover Boss (US version)
Wife Swap (US version)
Wipeout (US version)

References

External links
 

Channel 4 television channels
Television channels in the United Kingdom
Television channels and stations established in 2022
2022 establishments in the United Kingdom